Nogometno društvo Mura 05, commonly referred to as ND Mura 05 or simply Mura 05, was a Slovenian football club from the town of Murska Sobota. The club was established on 16 June 2005. The club's home ground was Fazanerija City Stadium. During the summer of 2013, Mura 05 were declared bankrupt and dissolved months after the 2012–13 season, after they had spent two successive seasons in the top division.

History
ND Mura 05 was founded on 16 June 2005. The club emerged after the dissolution of NK Mura, a club which played in the Slovenian PrvaLiga for many years, but went bankrupt and was dissolved in 2005. However, ND Mura 05 is legally not considered to be the successor of NK Mura and the statistics and honours of the two clubs are kept separate by the Football Association of Slovenia.

Mura 05 finished the 2010–11 Slovenian Second League in fourth place, behind Aluminij, Interblock and Dravinja. However, all three clubs declined promotion to the Slovenian PrvaLiga due to financial reasons. As the next club on the league table, Mura 05 received and accepted an invitation to join the top division. Although the main goal of the season was to stay in the top division, Mura 05 exceeded their expectations and finished the 2011–12 Slovenian PrvaLiga in third place, gaining the right to play in the UEFA Europa League in the next season. After the 2012–13 season, the club went into the financial difficulties again and was dissolved. The newly established club used its youth selections to register a team for the 2013–14 season under the name NŠ Mura.

Honours
Slovenian Third League
 Winners: 2005–06

League history

European record 
Summary

Matches
All results (home and away) list Mura's goal tally first.

Notes

Managers
 Edin Osmanović (2007–2008)
 Primoz Gliha (2009–2010)
 Robert Pevnik (2011)
 Ante Šimundža (2011–2012)
 Franc Cifer (interim) (2012)
 Oliver Bogatinov (2012–2013)
 Ante Šimundža (2013)

References

External links
Soccerway profile

 
Association football clubs established in 2005
2005 establishments in Slovenia
Defunct football clubs in Slovenia
Association football clubs disestablished in 2013
2013 disestablishments in Slovenia